Bălăbăneşti may refer to:

Bălăbăneşti, a commune in Galați County, Romania
Bălăbăneşti, a commune in Criuleni district, Moldova